The 1975 Brazilian Grand Prix was a Formula One motor race held at Interlagos on 26 January 1975. It was race 2 of 14 in both the 1975 World Championship of Drivers and the 1975 International Cup for Formula One Manufacturers. It was the fourth Brazilian Grand Prix since its introduction in 1972. The race was won by São Paulo native Carlos Pace driving a Brabham BT44B. It was the only win of Pace's career; he was killed in an aircraft accident two years later. Since 1985, the circuit holds his name. It would be eight years before another Brazilian would win the Grand Prix. Fellow Brazilian Emerson Fittipaldi finished second in his McLaren M23 with his German teammate Jochen Mass finishing third.

Qualifying

Qualifying classification

Race summary 

Jean-Pierre Jarier took pole position, after beating the 1973 pole record. He lined up ahead of local driver Emerson Fittipaldi. The race was delayed whilst the track was washed down to remove debris – punctures had played a critical part in the 1974 race and race organisers wanted to avoid a repeat of these problems.

This was the 176th and last championship race start of Graham Hill's Formula One career.

Brazilian drivers finished 1–2 in the race (for first time in the history of the category), with Carlos Pace taking the only win of his career and Emerson Fittipaldi finishing second. A local 1–2 also occurred in the 1986 Brazilian Grand Prix with Nelson Piquet winning from Ayrton Senna.

Race classification

Championship standings after the race

Drivers' Championship standings

Constructors' Championship standings

Note: Only the top five positions are included for both sets of standings.

References

Brazilian Grand Prix
Brazilian Grand Prix
Grand Prix
Brazilian Grand Prix